The following is a list of Western Bulldogs (formerly Footscray Football Club) leading goalkickers in each season of the Australian Football League (formerly the Victorian Football League) and AFL Women's.

VFL/AFL

AFL Women's

References
Western Bulldogs Goalkicking Records

Goalkickers, leading
Australian rules football-related lists
Melbourne sport-related lists